Douglas Hoyos-Trauttmansdorff (born 8 September 1990) is an Austrian politician of NEOS – The New Austria. He has served as a member of the National Council since 2017 and general-secretary of NEOS since 2021. Previously, he was president of the party's youth branch, JUNOS – Young liberal NEOS, from 2014 to 2019.

Biography
Douglas Hoyos-Trauttmansdorff is a member of the Hoyos family. He studied economics at the Vienna University of Economics from 2010. Before 2017, he worked as a project manager at NEOS and a forestry company.

In 2012, Hoyos was elected as General-Secretary of JuLis – Young Liberals Austria, a liberal youth organisation. He played a leading role in the integration of JuLis as the official youth branch of NEOS. In 2014, he was elected president of JuLis, now renamed as JUNOS – Young liberal NEOS. He left office in 2019.

He was elected to the National Council on the NEOS federal list in the 2017 federal election. In 2021, he was elected general-secretary of NEOS.

References

External links 
 
 NEOS, Douglas Hoyos, Biography
 Douglas Hoyos at www.meineabgeordneten.at

1990 births
Living people
21st-century Austrian politicians
Members of the National Council (Austria)
NEOS – The New Austria politicians